Zinat (Also known as Sebt zinat constituency/ in Arabic جماعة سبت الزينات, Berber ⵣⵉⵏⴰⵜ) is a village in northern Morocco, situated 20 kilometres east of the city of Tangier, 50 south of the city of Tétouan. It is also home to Ibn Battuta Dam (سد إبن بطوطة) which provides the city of Tangier with drinking water.

Populated places in Tanger-Tetouan-Al Hoceima
Tétouan
Rif